Dương Văn Khoa (born 6 May 1994) is a Vietnamese footballer who plays as a full-back for V.League 1 club Hải Phòng.

References

1994 births
Living people
Vietnamese footballers
Association football fullbacks
V.League 1 players
Than Quang Ninh FC players
Ho Chi Minh City FC players
Haiphong FC players